Gelbensande is a municipality  in the German state of Mecklenburg-Vorpommern. It is located in the Rostock district, near Rostock, Ribnitz-Damgarten and Stralsund. Four other villages are part of Gelbensande.

It can be reached by car on B 105, as well as by train (Stralsund–Rostock railway).

Hunting lodge

Jagdschloss Gelbensande is a hunting lodge or manor that was erected between 1880 and 1885 as a summer residence for Grand Duke Friedrich Franz III of Mecklenburg-Schwerin. After 1887, it was used as a base for hunting in the surrounding forest, the Rostock Heath. Because of the Grand Duke's marriage to one of the Russian Tsar's granddaughters, the Mecklenburg-Russian relationships can still be seen inside the castle today.

The Jagdschloss remained in the Grand Duke's use until 1944. It was subsequently used as an army hospital, a sanatorium for tuberculosis, a public library, a veteran's club and a sort of hostel for construction workers. Since the German reunification in 1989/1990, it is owned by the town of Gelbensande and open to the public as a museum.

Wilhelm von Preußen, German crown prince and son of Kaiser Wilhelm II, got engaged to Duchess Cecilie of Mecklenburg-Schwerin in the Jagdschloss.

References

External links

  official page (German)